The Theodotos inscription is the earliest known inscription from a synagogue. It was found in December 1913 by Raymond Weill in Wadi Hilweh (known as the City of David).

It is the earliest-known evidence of a synagogue building in the region of Palestine.

The ten-line inscription is on an ashlar stone measuring 71x45cm.

Discovery
The inscription was found during Weill's excavations, in a cistern labelled "C2". Weill described the cistern as being filled with "large discarded wall materials, sometimes deposited in a certain order, enormous rubble stones, numerous cubic blocks with well-cut sides, a few sections of columns:  someone filled this hole with the debris of a demolished building".

Inscription

Greek script

Transliteration
Th[e]ódotos Ouettḗnou, hiereùs kaì | a[r]chisynágōgos, yiòs archisyn[agṓ]|g[o]y, yionòs archisyn[a]gṓgou, ōko|dómēse tḕn synagog[ḗ]n eis an[ágn]ō||s[in] nómou kaí eis [d]idach[ḕ]n entolο̂n, kaí t[ò]n xenο̂na, ka[ì tà] dṓmata kaì tà chrē|s[t]ḗria tòn hydátōn eis katályma toî|s [ch]rḗzousin apò tês xé[n]ēs, hḕn etheme|l[íō]san hoi patéres [a]utoù kaí hoi pre||s[b]ýteroi kaì Simon[í]dēs.

Translation
Theodotos son of Vettenus, priest and head of the synagogue (archisynágōgos), son of a head of the synagogue, and grandson of a head of the synagogue, built the synagogue for the reading of the law and for the teaching of the commandments, as well as the guest room, the chambers, and the water fittings as an inn for those in need from abroad, the synagogue which his fathers founded with the elders and Simonides.

Notes

Bibliography

Secondary sources
 John S. Kloppenborg, “Dating Theodotus (CIJ II 1404),” Journal of Jewish Studies 51 (2000) 243-280
 John S. Kloppenborg: The Theodotos Synagogue Inscription and the Problem of First-Century Synagogue Buildings. In: James H. Charlesworth (Hrsg.): Jesus and Archaeology. Eerdmans, Grand Rapids 2006, S. 236–282.
 Fine, Steven. "6. The Emergence of the Synagogue". Early Judaism: New Insights and Scholarship, edited by Frederick E. Greenspahn and Frederick E. Greenspahn, New York, USA: New York University Press, 2018, pp. 123-146. https://doi.org/10.18574/nyu/9781479896950.003.0007
 Jonathan J. Price: Synagogue building inscription of Theodotos in Greek, 1 c. BCE–1 c. CE. In: Hannah M. Cotton u. a. (Hrsg.): Corpus Inscriptionum Iudaeae/Palaestinae. Bd. 1: Jerusalem, Teil 1. De Gruyter, Berlin 2010, S. 53–56 (online).
 Gustav Adolf Deissmann: Licht vom Osten. Das Neue Testament und die neuentdeckten Texte der hellenistisch-römischen Welt. 4., völlig neubearbeitete Auflage. Mohr, Tübingen 1923, S. 379–380.
 Rachel Hachlili: Ancient Synagogues – Archaeology and Art: New Discoveries and Current Research (= Handbook of Oriental Studies, Section 1: Ancient Near East. Band 105). Brill, Leiden 2013, S. 523–526. (online)
 Howard Clark Kee: The Transformation of the Synagogue After 70 C.E.: Its Import for Early Christianity. In: New Testament Studies. Band 36, Nr. 1, 1990, S. 1–24 (Extract).
 Howard Clark Kee: Defining the First-Century CE Synagogue: Problems and Progress. In: New Testament Studies. Band 41, Nr. 4, 1995, S. 481–500 (Extract).
 Max Küchler: Jerusalem. Ein Handbuch und Studienreiseführer zur Heiligen Stadt. Vandenhoeck & Ruprecht, Göttingen 2007, .
 Charles Simon Clermont-Ganneau, Une inscription grecque sur bloc de calcaire, découverte à Jérusalem sur le mont Ophel, Comptes rendus des séances de l'Académie des Inscriptions et Belles-Lettres  Année 1920  64-3  pp. 187-189
 Charles Simon Clermont-Ganneau. “Découverte a Jérusalem D'une Synagogue De L'epoque Hérodienne.” Syria, vol. 1, no. 3, 1920, pp. 190–197. JSTOR, www.jstor.org/stable/4195086

Primary sources
 Raymond Weill: La Cité de David. Campagne de 1913–1914. Geuthner, Paris 1920 (archive).

Ancient synagogues
Greek inscriptions